The Australian national baseball team represents Australia in international baseball tournaments and competitions. It is ranked as the top team in Oceania, and is the Oceanian Champion, having been awarded the title in 2007 when New Zealand withdrew from the Oceania Baseball Championship. After achieving a last (16th) place in the 2013 World Baseball Classic, its rank dropped to 13, which is the lowest rank Australia ever received. The highest rank it has achieved is 6th, and it’s current rank is 10th.

The Australian team participated in the Summer Olympic Games in 1996, 2000, and 2004, but failed to qualify for 2008. The team has also participated in both of the other major international baseball tournaments recognised by the International Baseball Federation (IBAF): the Baseball World Cup and most recently the World Baseball Classic (WBC).

The team is controlled by the Australian Baseball Federation, which is represented in the Baseball Confederation of Oceania (BCO). Prior to the BCO's formation, Australia competed in the Asian Baseball Championship under the Baseball Federation of Asia (BFA). Australia continues to have a relationship with the BFA; the 2011 resumption of the Asia Series includes the Australian Baseball League's champion team. Team Australia came in 6th in the 12-team 2019 WBSC Premier12 Tournament, in November 2019.

Current roster

Results and fixtures 
The following is a list of professional baseball match results currently active in the latest version of the WBSC World Rankings, as well as any future matches that have been scheduled.

Legend

2019

2022

2023

World ranking 

In January 2009 the International Baseball Federation created a ranking system so that the nations involved in international competition could be compared independently. Teams receive points based on the position they finish at the end of tournaments. The system takes into account results not only of the senior men's teams but also of junior teams. Weightings that emphasise the importance of certain tournaments are based on the number of teams competing, the number of continents represented (or eligible to be represented), and in the case of continental tournaments such as the Oceania Baseball Championship the relative strength of teams eligible. Only results within the previous four years are used, so points are added and removed over time. Since the system began, the rankings have been adjusted after the completion of tournaments qualifying for the ranking process; the most recent was the 2009 Baseball World Cup.

When the rankings were first introduced, Australia was listed at 10th position. The high-water mark was after the 2009 World Baseball Classic when they were in 9th. The lowest position they have been in the ranking since its inception is 11th. At the end of 2010, Australia had returned to their original position of 10th.

International competition 
In January 2009 the IBAF, in releasing the first edition of the world rankings, announced the classifications of various tournaments that contributed to the rankings themselves. In doing so, they identified that of the "world" tournaments, there were different levels with differing levels of weighting towards the ranks: major world championships, minor world championships, world qualifying tournaments and continental championships/qualifying tournaments.

Major world championships 
There are currently three recognised tournaments that are considered "major" by the IBAF: the World Baseball Classic, the Summer Olympic Games and the Baseball World Cup. Of those, the Summer Olympics will be phased out of the rankings structure, as baseball will no longer be contested as an Olympic event.

World Baseball Classic 

Australia has competed in all four editions of the World Baseball Classic. All sixteen teams that played in the 2006 edition were invited to compete in the second in 2009. By virtue of their third-place finish in their first-round pool, Australia qualified compete at the 2013 edition of the WBC.; however, they were eliminated with an 0–3 record and finished in last place overall.

Australia, which has not progressed beyond the first round of competition, achieved its highest finish, 9th, in the 2017 tournament. Unusual for international competition in baseball, the squads selected in the World Baseball Classic tournaments featured players active in Major League Baseball in addition to Minor League, Nippon Professional Baseball and local players. Generally players in the Major Leagues are unavailable for international representative teams due to their contracts with the respective clubs.

United States, 2006 

Prior to formally starting their campaign, Australia played an exhibition game, which they lost, against a Boston Red Sox squad at City of Palms Park in Fort Myers, Florida. This was also the site of their training camp.

Australia competed in Pool D—along with Dominican Republic, Italy and Venezuela—in the first round at Cracker Jack Stadium in Orlando, Florida. The other three teams were able to field a large number of Major League players. Of players born outside the United States on 2006 Major League Opening Day rosters, the Dominican Republic (85) and Venezuela (43) had more than all other countries and between them accounted for more than 57% of foreign-born players in the leagues. Italy is among the top nations in Europe and had access to Italian-American players under the eligibility rules for the tournament. Thus, Australia was considered the underdog in the pool.

Having failed to win any of their round-robin pool games, they finished last in their pool, and were eliminated with Canada, China, Chinese Taipei, Italy, Netherlands, Panama and South Africa. The eventual champions were Japan.

Mexico, 2009 

Australia was based in Peoria, Arizona—the site of the Seattle Mariners spring training camp—for their preparation for the formal start of their 2009 campaign. Unlike 2006, in which they had one exhibition game, they competed against three different Major League clubs: the Seattle Mariners, the Milwaukee Brewers and the Chicago White Sox. Their game against Seattle was Ken Griffey Jr.'s first game playing for the Mariners since October 1999, and was also their first victory as part of a World Baseball Classic tour.

Australia was drawn in Pool B for the 2009 tournament, along with Cuba, Mexico and South Africa, competing at Foro Sol Stadium in Mexico City. After beating Mexico in their opening game, they lost their next two games to Cuba and Mexico, and were eliminated from the tournament. The Australians set a WBC record against Mexico: 22 hits in a single game is more than any other team has achieved in either tournament.

Taiwan, 2013 

In June 2011, it was announced that the field for the 2013 WBC would be expanded to include an additional 12 teams and that a qualifying round would be several months prior to the main tournament. The qualifying tournament involved the 12 newly invited teams, as well as the four lowest-placed teams from the 2009 tournament; all teams who did not win a game. The qualifying tournament broke the teams into four pools of four teams each, which competed in a six-game, modified double-elimination format, similar to the first round of the 2009 tournament, with the winners of the sixth game in each pool proceeding to the main tournament. Australia, having finished 12th after beating Mexico in their first game in 2009, automatically qualified for the main tournament.

The main tournament combined elements of both previous WBC editions. The first round was split all teams into four pools, where the teams competed in a round-robin, as was the case in the 2006 tournament. The second round used the same modified double-elimination format as used in the 2009 tournament and the 2013 qualifying tournament. The final round was contested in the same manner as both previous tournaments: the top two teams from each group in the second round qualifying for the two semi-final matches, the winners of which played in the championship game.

Australia was drawn into Pool B, which was held at the Taichung Intercontinental Baseball Stadium in Taiwan. In their opener, they fell to host and qualifiers Chinese Taipei, 4–1. They followed up with a 6–0 loss to South Korea before finishing with a 4–1 defeat to the Netherlands.

Pool B Game 1

Game 4

Game 5

* – Player has not played for Australia in international competition prior to 2013 WBC
† – Player did not play for Australia in WBC prior to 2013

Japan, 2023

Olympic Games 

Australia was the third nation, after the United States and Sweden, to participate in baseball at the Summer Olympics, making their first appearance at the 1956 Games in Melbourne, and again as part of its demonstration at the 1988 Games in Seoul. Though the sport has applied for re-admission for 2016, baseball is no longer contested as a medal event at the Olympics.

Since baseball was first included as a medal sport at the 1992 Games in Barcelona, Australia has participated in three of the five tournaments. The best result achieved was in the 2004 Games in Athens, where Australia lost the gold medal match to Cuba to receive silver. Their medal tally puts them at 5th, equal to Chinese Taipei.

Australia did not send a team to the 2021 Olympic qualifiers.

World Cup 

Australia has participated in ten of the IBAF World Cup tournaments. To date its best result has been 5th, which Australia has achieved twice in both of the most recent tournaments held—2009 and 2011. At the 2007 tournament, Trent Oeltjen became the first Australian player to be named in a World Cup All Star team, in recognition of his tournament-leading hitting and base-running statistics. Australia is currently participating in the 2011 tournament in Panama.

Until 1986, the World Cup was actually referred to as the "Amateur World Series". The Amateur World Series only made use of round-robin fixtures, with teams ranked at the end of the tournament. Australia's first appearance was in Italy in 1978. Out of the ten teams to compete, Australia finished 9th ahead of the other debuting team, Belgium.

Since the 1988 tournament, it has held the "World Cup" name, with the IBAF recognising the past Amateur World Series winners as World Cup winners. With the change of name came a change in format for the tournament: a round-robin phase, followed by a knockout phase for the top four teams. (Later tournaments would see two pools used in the first phase, and an expanded knockout phase including the top four teams from each pool.) In the "World Cup Era", Australia has reached the final phase four times, finishing 7th in 1998, 6th in 2007 and most recently 5th in 2009 and 2011.

Premier12 Tournament

2019
Team Australia came in sixth in the 12-team 2019 WBSC Premier12 Tournament in November  2019.

Minor world championships 
There are six separate tournaments that the IBAF currently recognises as "minor world championships". Of those, Australia has only participated in one senior tournament: the Intercontinental Cup. (Australia has also participated in the World Junior Baseball Championship and the World Youth Baseball Championship, both of which are also included in the same category for the IBAF rankings.)

Intercontinental Cup 
Australia is one of five nations to have won the Intercontinental Cup, winning the 1999 tournament by beating Cuba 4–3 in extra innings in front of a home crowd in Sydney. It was the first time Australia had won an international baseball tournament, and through 2009 the only win outside of the Oceania Baseball Championship. The team enjoyed several individual successes as well:
 Dave Nilsson named tournament MVP, to go along with leading the tournament for runs batted in (12) and being named in the tournament all-star team (as catcher)
 Shayne Bennett led the tournament pitching with the best win–loss record (3–0)
 Adam Burton led the tournament batting with the most runs scored (9)
 Michael Moyle shared the lead in the tournament with Oscar Macias (Cuba), with the most home runs (3)
 two other Australians were selected along with Dave Nilsson in the all-star team: Adrian Meagher (right-handed pitcher) and Michael Moyle (designated hitter)

It was only the third time Cuba had been beaten in the gold medal match in the tournament's history, having reached the tournament decider every time they have participated. Australia also shares another honour with Cuba: of the nine nations to have hosted the tournament, only Australia and Cuba have won as hosts, combining for five tournament wins from five times hosted. (Cuba in 1979, 1987, 1995 and 2002, Australia in 1999.)

Australia first participated in the tournament at the 1981 Intercontinental Cup, managing only one win out of their seven games, finishing 8th. Missing the 1983 Intercontinental Cup, they returned in 1985 to repeat their previous performance: 1 win, 8th-place finish. They would not reappear at the tournament until 1993 where they improved to a 5–4 record to finish in 6th position.
Australia's first medal performance at the Intercontinental Cup (and their first medal at a world tournament) was at the 1997 tournament. In their best performance through the preliminary round, they put together a 6–1 record losing only to eventual silver-medalists Cuba, and beating eventual gold-medalists Japan. They lost to Japan in the semi-final, but beat the United States for the second time in the tournament to secure the bronze.

Australia also competed in the most recent tournament in 2006. There they finished in 5th position, compiling a 3–4 record. This is likely to be the last edition of the tournament for the foreseeable future.

Continental tournaments 
Australia is the second of only two nations to have participated in IBAF-sanctioned continental tournaments for more than one continent: the Asian Baseball Championship between 1971 and 1993, and the Oceania Baseball Championship since 2003. The first nation to achieve this was Guam, who competed in the Asian tournament within the same timeframe as Australia, though they were involved in the first Oceania tournament in 1999.

Asian Baseball Championship 
Australia is one of thirteen nations to have participated in the Asian Baseball Championship since the tournament was first held in 1954. The last time they contested the championship was in 1993, as a result of joining the newly formed Baseball Confederation of Oceania. Though their best result was a bronze medal in the 1975, the only teams to consistently finish ahead of Australia were Japan, South Korea and Chinese Taipei—the top three teams in Asia, and all in the top five in the world.

Oceania Baseball Championship 
Though scheduled to participate on three separate occasions, Australia has only contested the Oceania Baseball Championship once in 2003. The two other times, Australia's scheduled opponents—Guam in 2004 and New Zealand in 2007—withdrew from competition in the lead up to each series, both times scheduled to be held in Sydney. Australia was awarded the championship both times, and as a result represented Oceania at the 2004 Summer Olympics and at the 2007 Baseball World Cup respectively.

(Guam won the third game .)

See also 
Australian Baseball Federation
World Baseball Classic
Summer Olympic Games
Baseball World Cup

Footnotes 
Olympic Games

Oceania Baseball Championship

References

Bibliography

External links 

 Team Australia official site
 Australian Baseball Federation
 World Baseball Classic
 International Olympic Committee
 

 
National
National baseball teams
Baseball teams established in 1897
1897 establishments in Australia